Antaramej is a village in the Chambarak Municipality of the Gegharkunik Province of Armenia.

Etymology 
The village was known as Meshakend until 1991, and until 1978, Yanigpaya.

References

External links 
 
 

Populated places in Gegharkunik Province